WDQN may refer to:

 WDQN (AM), a radio station (1580 AM) licensed to Du Quoin, Illinois, United States
 WDQN-FM, a radio station (95.9 FM) licensed to Du Quoin, Illinois, United States